Texas Proposition 7 may refer to various ballot measures in Texas, including:

2007 Texas Proposition 7
2021 Texas Proposition 7